Bogusław Sobczak (born June 25, 1979 in Kraków) is a Polish politician. He was elected to the Sejm on September 25, 2005 getting 6480 votes in 15 Tarnów district, candidating from the League of Polish Families list.

See also
 Members of Polish Sejm 2005-2007

External links
 Bogusław Sobczak - parliamentary page - includes declarations of interest, voting record, and transcripts of speeches.

1979 births
Living people
Politicians from Kraków
Members of the Polish Sejm 2005–2007
League of Polish Families politicians